James Shepherd Pike (September 8, 1811 – November 29, 1882) was an American journalist and a historian of South Carolina during the Reconstruction Era.

Biography
Pike was born in Calais, Maine, and was a journalist in the United States during the mid 19th century. From 1850-1860 he was the chief Washington correspondent and associate editor of the New York Tribune. The Tribune was the chief source of news and commentary for many Republican newspapers across the country. Republican editors reprinted his dispatches prior to the outbreak of the American Civil War. In 1854 he led the fight against the Kansas-Nebraska Act, calling for the formation of a new political entity to oppose it. Pike wrote that a "solid phalanx of aggression rears its black head everywhere south of Mason and Dixon's line, banded for the propagation of Slavery all over the continent." His reports were, "widely quoted, bitterly attacked or enthusiastically praised; they exerted a profound influence upon public opinion and gave to their author national prominence, first as an uncompromising anti-slavery Whig, and later as an ardent Republican."

President Abraham Lincoln appointed Pike to be minister to the Netherlands, where he fought Confederate diplomatic efforts and promoted the Union war aims from 1861 to 1866. On returning to Washington in 1866, Pike resumed writing for the New York Tribune and also wrote editorials for the New York Sun.

Pike was an outspoken Radical Republican, standing with Thaddeus Stevens and Charles Sumner and opposing President Andrew Johnson. Long before black suffrage became a major issue Pike had come to believe that the freed slaves must be given the vote. Pike in 1866–67 strongly supported Black suffrage and the disqualification of most ex-Confederates from holding office.

Pike did not admire Ulysses S. Grant as a politician, and drifted away from the Republican party. By 1872 Pike was disenchanted with Black suffrage and the corruption and failures of Reconstruction.  He argued the federal government should withdraw its soldiers from the Southern states. He was a strong supporter of the Liberal Republican movement that in 1872 opposed President Ulysses Grant, denouncing the corruption of his administration. Pike's boss, New York Tribune editor Horace Greeley, was the Liberal Republican nominee in 1872. Greeley lost to Grant by a landslide, then died. The new editor of the Tribune Whitelaw Reid sent Pike to South Carolina to study the conditions in the deep South under Reconstruction.

Pike's reports on South Carolina
In 1873 Pike toured South Carolina and wrote a series of newspaper articles, reprinted in newspapers across the country and republished in book form in 1874 as The Prostrate State: South Carolina under Negro Government. It was a widely read and highly influential first hand account of the details of Reconstruction government in South Carolina, that systematically exposed what Pike considered to be corruption, incompetence, bribery, financial misdeeds and misbehavior in the state legislature. His critics argued that the tone and emphasis was distorted and hostile toward African Americans and Grant Republicans.

The Prostrate State painted a lurid picture of corruption. Historian Eric Foner writes:
The book depicted a state engulfed by political corruption, drained by governmental extravagance, and under the control of "a mass of black barbarism." The South's problems, he insisted, arose from "Negro government." The solution was to restore leading whites to political power.

Historian John Hope Franklin said, "James S. Pike, the Maine journalist, wrote an account of misrule in South Carolina, appropriately called The Prostrate State, and painted a lurid picture of the conduct of Negro legislators and the general lack of decorum in the management of public affairs. Written so close to the period and first published as a series of newspaper pieces, The Prostrate State should perhaps not be classified as history at all. But for many years the book was regarded as authoritative—contemporary history at its best. According to Robert Franklin Durden, Pike did not really attempt to tell what he saw or even what happened in South Carolina during Reconstruction. By picking and choosing from his notes those events and incidents that supported his argument, he sought to place responsibility for the failure of Reconstruction on the Grant administration and on the freedmen, whom he despised with equal passion.

Durden wrote that the fundamental clue to Pike's hostile characterization of African Americans in his book The Prostrate State was that "in the 1850s no less than in the 1870s, . . . [we see] his constant antipathy toward the Negro race."

In his biographical study of Pike, Durden concluded that Pike had been ardently "free soil" before the American Civil War because he thought that the West should belong to the white man. Durden said Pike despaired of living alongside arrogant slaveholders and their repulsive human property, and that he urged peaceful secession during the 1860-61 crisis partly because he had one eye cocked on the chance of getting rid of a "mass of barbarism" and that during some of the Civil War's darker days he would have settled for a compromise peace if it meant only that a Gulf coast or Deep South "negro pen" would be lost to the Federal Union. Durden wrote that The Prostrate State makes sense only in this context, and to the extent that Pike's racial views were representative, "the Civil War and Reconstruction take on a new dimension of tragedy."

Historian Mark Summers concludes that Pike stressed the sensational, but "however maliciously and mendaciously he shaded his evidence, his accounts squared with those of his colleagues Charles Nordhoff of the New York Herald and H. P. Redfield of the Cincinnati Commercial. James Freeman Clarke, a leading Boston abolitionist, visited South Carolina and reported back to his Boston congregation that the facts presented by Pike, "were confirmed by every man whom I saw."

Durden (2000) reports:
A sweeping indictment of Republican rule in this state (and, by inference, other southern states), Pike's dramatic, "eye-witness" account gained much attention throughout the country. The book was so popular because it was seen as the work of an allegedly impartial Maine Republican and old foe of slavery who had come to his senses about the "wicked corruption" of the carpetbaggers and their "ignorant and barbaric" Negro allies. Pike's book not only played a role in the ending of Reconstruction but was much used by historians well into the twentieth century. In fact, it was far from objective, simply reflecting Pike's long-standing racism.

Bibliography
 Durden, Robert F. James Shepherd Pike. Republicanism and the American Negro, 1850–1882 (Duke University Press, 1957). 
 Durden, Robert F. "Pike, James Shepherd"; American National Biography Online February 2000
 Historian John Hope Franklin discusses Pike's work 
 Franklin, John Hope. Race and History: Selected Essays 1938-1988, Baton Rouge: Louisiana State University Press, 1989.
 James M. McPherson. The Abolitionist Legacy: From Reconstruction to the NAACP (1975)
 Pike, James Shepherd, The Prostrate State: South Carolina Under Negro Government(New York, 1874). full text online at Making of America, University of Michigan; paperback edition with introduction by Durden (1974)
 Pike, James Shepherd, First Blows of the Civil War (1879), collection of Pike's Tribune editorials and political letters  online edition
 Mark Wahlgren Summers, The Press Gang: Newspapers and Politics, 1865-1878 (1994)
 Van Cleve, Thomas C. "Pike, James Shepherd, (Sept. 8, 1811 - Nov. 29, 1882)" in Dictionary of American Biography (1934)

References

External links
  James Shepherd Pike Find A Grave Memorial
  Guide to the James Shepherd Pike Papers, Raymond H. Fogler Library, University of Maine
  The Prostrate State: South Carolina under Negro Government, 1874 edition—Complete text.

1811 births
1882 deaths
African-American history of South Carolina
Ambassadors of the United States to the Netherlands
American abolitionists
American political writers
Bleeding Kansas
Crime in South Carolina
Historians of South Carolina
Historians of the Reconstruction Era
Legal history of South Carolina
New York (state) Liberal Republicans
New York (state) Republicans
People from Calais, Maine
People of the Reconstruction Era
Politics of the Southern United States
Radical Republicans
19th-century American diplomats
19th-century American journalists
American male journalists
1854 in American politics
1870s in South Carolina
19th-century male writers
Maine Whigs